Ametys is a free and open source content management system (CMS) written in Java. It is based on JSR-170 for content storage, Open Social for gadget rendering and a XML oriented framework. It is primarily designed to run large corporate websites, blogs, intranets and extranets on the same server.

, Ametys claims to run more than 30 000 websites.

Ametys is Java based and runs on any computing platform capable of running the Java Runtime Environment and an application server.

History 
Ametys is a professional open-source CMS (content management system) written in Java.

Ametys was created in 2003 by passionate Web and Java experts. Since 2005 Ametys has been deployed in higher education, for which specific components for uPortal and Jasig projects were developed.
In 2009, it was ported to the level of a professional open source CMS by Anyware Services (headquarters in France).

Ametys evolved through the collaboration of the community of developers, users and integrators.

The downloadable version includes user authentication via LDAP and CAS, and a WYSIWYG editor administration.

Ametys 3.4 was released in August 2012 and saw several improvements and new functionality including new plugins as UGC, glossary, FAQ, and blog management. It also included new practices of Social web.

Modules 
Ametys comes with many features :
 Multi-site and multilingual platform
 Front-end editing
 RSS feed support
 Document library manager, Alfresco and other document library integration
 LDAP Integration
 Website Tools : comments feed, Share buttons, Twitter feed integration, OpenSocial gadgets
 Blogs and wikis
 Newsletter management
 Web Form management
 Online survey management
 Maps

External links

References

Content management systems
Free content management systems
Document management systems
Web frameworks
Free software programmed in Java (programming language)
Java platform software
Free software
Cross-platform software